A special right triangle is a right triangle with some regular feature that makes calculations on the triangle easier, or for which simple formulas exist. For example, a right triangle may have angles that form simple relationships, such as 45°–45°–90°. This is called an "angle-based" right triangle. A "side-based" right triangle is one in which the lengths of the sides form ratios of whole numbers, such as 3 : 4 : 5, or of other special numbers such as the golden ratio. Knowing the relationships of the angles or ratios of sides of these special right triangles allows one to quickly calculate various lengths in geometric problems without resorting to more advanced methods.

Angle-based

"Angle-based" special right triangles are specified by the relationships of the angles of which the triangle is composed. The angles of these triangles are such that the larger (right) angle, which is 90 degrees or  radians, is equal to the sum of the other two angles.

The side lengths are generally deduced from the basis of the unit circle or other geometric methods.  This approach may be used to rapidly reproduce the values of trigonometric functions for the angles 30°, 45°, and 60°.

Special triangles are used to aid in calculating common trigonometric functions, as below:

The 45°–45°–90° triangle, the 30°–60°–90° triangle, and the equilateral/equiangular (60°–60°–60°) triangle are the three Möbius triangles in the plane, meaning that they tessellate the plane via reflections in their sides; see Triangle group.

45°–45°–90° triangle

In plane geometry, constructing the diagonal of a square results in a triangle whose three angles are in the ratio 1 : 1 : 2, adding up to 180° or  radians.  Hence, the angles respectively measure 45°, 45°, and 90°.  The sides in this triangle are in the ratio 1 : 1 : , which follows immediately from the Pythagorean theorem.

Of all right triangles, the 45°–45°–90° degree triangle has the smallest ratio of the hypotenuse to the sum of the legs, namely . and the greatest ratio of the altitude from the hypotenuse to the sum of the legs, namely .

Triangles with these angles are the only possible right triangles that are also isosceles triangles in Euclidean geometry. However, in spherical geometry and hyperbolic geometry, there are infinitely many different shapes of right isosceles triangles.

30°–60°–90° triangle

This is a triangle whose three angles are in the ratio 1 : 2 : 3 and respectively measure 30°, 60°, and 90°. The sides are in the ratio 1 :  : 2.

The proof of this fact is clear using trigonometry.  The geometric proof is:

Draw an equilateral triangle ABC with side length 2 and with point D as the midpoint of segment BC.  Draw an altitude line from A to D.  Then ABD is a 30°–60°–90° triangle with hypotenuse of length 2, and base BD of length 1.

The fact that the remaining leg AD has length  follows immediately from the Pythagorean theorem.

The 30°–60°–90° triangle is the only right triangle whose angles are in an arithmetic progression. The proof of this fact is simple and follows on from the fact that if α,  are the angles in the progression then the sum of the angles  = 180°. After dividing by 3, the angle  must be 60°. The right angle is 90°, leaving the remaining angle to be 30°.

Side-based
Right triangles whose sides are of integer lengths, with the sides collectively known as Pythagorean triples, possess angles that cannot all be rational numbers of degrees.  (This follows from Niven's theorem.) They are most useful in that they may be easily remembered and any multiple of the sides produces the same relationship. Using Euclid's formula for generating Pythagorean triples, the sides must be in the ratio

where m and n are any positive integers such that .

Common Pythagorean triples

There are several Pythagorean triples which are well-known, including those with sides in the ratios:

{| border="0" cellpadding="0" cellspacing="0"
!align="right"|3:||align="center"|4 ||align="left"|:5

|-
!align="right"|5:||align="center"|12||align="left"|:13
|-
!align="right"|8:||align="center"|15||align="left"|:17
|-
!align="right"|7:||align="center"|24||align="left"|:25
|-
!align="right"|9:||align="center"|40||align="left"|:41
|}

The 3 : 4 : 5 triangles are the only right triangles with edges in arithmetic progression. Triangles based on Pythagorean triples are Heronian, meaning they have integer area as well as integer sides.

The possible use of the 3 : 4 : 5 triangle in Ancient Egypt, with the supposed use of a knotted rope to lay out such a triangle, and the question whether Pythagoras' theorem was known at that time, have been much debated. It was first conjectured by the historian Moritz Cantor in 1882. It is known that right angles were laid out accurately in Ancient Egypt; that their surveyors did use ropes for measurement;  that Plutarch recorded in Isis and Osiris (around 100 AD) that the Egyptians admired the 3 : 4 : 5 triangle;  and that the Berlin Papyrus 6619 from the Middle Kingdom of Egypt (before 1700 BC) stated that "the area of a square of 100 is equal to that of two smaller squares. The side of one is ½ + ¼  the side of the other." The historian of mathematics Roger L. Cooke observes that "It is hard to imagine anyone being interested in such conditions without knowing the Pythagorean theorem."  Against this, Cooke notes that no Egyptian text before 300 BC actually mentions the use of the theorem to find the length of a triangle's sides, and that there are simpler ways to construct a right angle. Cooke concludes that Cantor's conjecture remains uncertain: he guesses that the Ancient Egyptians probably did know the Pythagorean theorem, but that "there is no evidence that they used it to construct right angles". 

The following are all the Pythagorean triple ratios expressed in lowest form (beyond the five smallest ones in lowest form in the list above) with both non-hypotenuse sides less than 256:

{| border="0" cellpadding="0" cellspacing="0" align="left"
!align="right"|11:||align="center"|60||align="left"|:61||    
|-
!align="right"|12:||align="center"|35||align="left"|:37
|-
!align="right"|13:||align="center"|84||align="left"|:85
|-
!align="right"|15:||align="center"|112||align="left"|:113
|-
!align="right"|16:||align="center"|63||align="left"|:65
|-
!align="right"|17:||align="center"|144||align="left"|:145
|-
!align="right"|19:||align="center"|180||align="left"|:181
|-
!align="right"|20:||align="center"|21||align="left"|:29
|-
!align="right"|20:||align="center"|99||align="left"|:101
|-
!align="right"|21:||align="center"|220||align="left"|:221
|}

Almost-isosceles Pythagorean triples
However, infinitely many almost-isosceles right triangles do exist. These are right-angled triangles with integer sides for which the lengths of the non-hypotenuse edges differ by one. Such almost-isosceles right-angled triangles can be obtained recursively,

a0 = 1, b0 = 2
an = 2bn−1 + an−1bn = 2an + bn−1

an is length of hypotenuse, n = 1, 2, 3, .... Equivalently,

where {x, y} are solutions to the Pell equation , with the hypotenuse y being the odd terms of the Pell numbers 1, 2, 5, 12, 29, 70, 169, 408, 985, 2378... ..  The smallest Pythagorean triples resulting are:

{| border="0" cellpadding="0" cellspacing="0"
!align="right"| 3 :|| align="center" | 4 ||align="left"|:         5
|-
!align="right"| 20 :|| align="center" | 21 ||align="left"|:        29
|-
!align="right"| 119 :|| align="center" | 120 ||align="left"|:       169
|-
!align="right"| 696 :|| align="center" | 697 ||align="left"|:       985
|-
!align="right"| 4,059 :|| align="center" | 4,060 ||align="left"|:     5,741
|-
!align="right"| 23,660 :|| align="center" | 23,661 ||align="left"|:    33,461
|-
!align="right"| 137,903 :|| align="center" | 137,904 ||align="left"|:   195,025
|-
!align="right"| 803,760 :|| align="center" | 803,761 ||align="left"|: 1,136,689
|-
!align="right"|4,684,659 :|| align="center" | 4,684,660 ||align="left"|: 6,625,109
|}

Alternatively, the same triangles can be derived from the square triangular numbers.

Arithmetic and geometric progressions

The Kepler triangle is a right triangle whose sides are in geometric progression. If the sides are formed from the geometric progression a, ar, ar2 then its common ratio r is given by r =  where φ is the golden ratio. Its sides are therefore in the ratio . Thus, the shape of the Kepler triangle is uniquely determined (up to a scale factor) by the requirement that its sides be in geometric progression.

The 3–4–5 triangle is the unique right triangle (up to scaling) whose sides are in arithmetic progression.

Sides of regular polygons

Let  be the side length of a regular decagon inscribed in the unit circle, where  is the golden ratio. Let  be the side length of a regular hexagon in the unit circle, and let  be the side length of a regular pentagon in the unit circle. Then , so these three lengths form the sides of a right triangle. The same triangle forms half of a golden rectangle.

See also
 Integer triangle
 Spiral of Theodorus

References

External links
 3 : 4 : 5 triangle
 30–60–90 triangle
 45–45–90 triangle with interactive animations

Euclidean plane geometry
Types of triangles